The Church of Saint Matthew (Italian: Chiesa di San Matteo or San Matteo al Cassaro) is a Baroque-style, Roman Catholic church of Palermo, region of Sicily, Italy. It is located in the main street of the city, the ancient Cassaro now Corso Vittorio Emanuele, in the quarter of the Loggia, about a block east of the Quattro Canti, within the historic centre of Palermo.

The church was built between 1633 and 1664 by the will of the Miseremini confraternity, dedicated to prayers for souls in Purgatory. The building was probably designed by the architect of the Senate of Palermo, Mariano Smiriglio, but was completed by Gaspare Guercio and Carlo D'Aprile. It is decorated with many works of important Sicilian artists like Vito D'Anna, Pietro Novelli, Giacomo Serpotta, Giuseppe Testa (painter), Bartolomeo Sanseverino, Filippo Randazzo, Antonio Manno, Francesco Sozzi.

The church is also connected to the palermitan legend of the Beati Paoli.

Gallery

External links 

 Gaspare Palermo, Guida istruttiva per potersi conoscere tutte le magnificenze della Città di Palermo, Volume I, Palermo, Reale Stamperia, 1816

Matteo
Baroque architecture in Palermo
17th-century Roman Catholic church buildings in Italy